George Sykes (September 20, 1802 – February 25, 1880) was an American Democratic Party politician who represented New Jersey's 2nd congressional district in the United States House of Representatives from 1843 to 1845, and was reelected in 1845 to fill a vacancy, serving until 1847.

Biography
Sykes was born in Sykesville, in North Hanover Township on September 20, 1802. He was educated by private teachers, and became a surveyor and conveyancer.

Congress
He was elected as a Democrat to the Twenty-eighth Congress, serving in office from March 4, 1843, to March 3, 1845. He was elected to the Twenty-ninth Congress to fill the vacancy caused by the death of Samuel G. Wright, and served from November 4, 1845, to March 3, 1847.

USS Princeton incident
He was a passenger aboard the USS Princeton on February 28, 1844, when one of its guns exploded killing six, including two members of President John Tyler's cabinet.

Later career and death
After leaving Congress, he served as a member of the council of properties of West Jersey and was a member of the New Jersey General Assembly from 1877 to 1879. He died near Mansfield Township, on February 25, 1880, and was interred in Old Upper Springfield Friends Burying Ground near Wrightstown, New Jersey.

References

External links

Congressional Biography
George Sykes at The Political Graveyard

1802 births
1880 deaths
Democratic Party members of the New Jersey General Assembly
Politicians from Burlington County, New Jersey
Burials in New Jersey
19th-century American politicians
Democratic Party members of the United States House of Representatives from New Jersey